Pseudophilotes vicrama, the eastern baton blue, is a small butterfly found in Asia, east to Tian Shan and parts of China, west to the Balkans, Turkey, eastern Europe to southern Finland. It belongs to the lycaenids or blues family. The species was first described by Frederic Moore in 1865.

Taxonomy 
This butterfly was earlier known as Polyommatus vicrama (Staudinger).

Range 
In Asia, it is found in South Asia from India (Himachal Pradesh) westwards to Balochistan and Chitral in Pakistan.

Mark Alexander Wynter-Blyth records the eastern baton blue as not rare locally and occurring in Baluchistan and from Chitral to Shipki La.

As per Savela, the butterfly is found in the Pamirs - Alay Mountains, Ghissar - Darvaz, Tian-Shan, north-west India south-eastEurope, Asia Minor, Caucasus, Transcaucasia, western Siberia, Altai, Turan and Kopet-Dagh.

Description 
The eastern baton blue is 20 to 26 mm in size. The male butterfly is pale dusky blue with a broad border, while the female is brown. The butterfly is named for its prominent chequered fringe. In Seitz, it is described as a form of Baton — In Anterior Asia, the males have a brighter colour, which has often a silvery white sheen; this is clara Christ.  — vicrama  from Afghanistan, has no distinct discocellular spot on the upperside of the forewing, there being also no dark marginal dots on the hindwing above. — cashmirensis Moore, form Kashmir, has a distinct black discocellular spot on the forewing like the European forms on the upperside, moreover, the forewing bears whitish marginal lunules and dark veins and the hindwing marginal dots.

Subspecies 
P. v. vicrama (Pamirs-Alai, Ghissar-Darvaz, Tian-Shan, north-western India)
P. v. cashmirensis (Moore, 1874) Northeast Kashmir
P. v. astabene (Hemming, 1932) (Kopet-Dagh)
P. v. clara (Christoph, 1887) (The Balkans, Middle East, United Arab Emirates, Oman, Turkestan)
P. v. pallida (Shchetkin, 1960) (Turan, southern Ghissar)
P. v. schiffermulleri (Hemming, 1929) (south-eastern Europe, Asia Minor, Caucasus, Transcaucasia, western Siberia, Altai)

See also 
 List of butterflies of India (Lycaenidae)

Cited references

References 
 
 
 

Butterflies described in 1865
Polyommatini
Butterflies of Europe
Butterflies of Asia
Taxa named by Frederic Moore